Events from the year 2002 in Taiwan, Republic of China. This year is numbered Minguo 91 according to the official Republic of China calendar.

Incumbents
 President – Chen Shui-bian
 Vice President – Annette Lu
 Premier – Chang Chun-hsiung, Yu Shyi-kun
 Vice Premier – Lai In-jaw, Lin Hsin-i

Events

March
 1 March – The establishment of Armaments Bureau.
 25 March – The renaming of Council of Aboriginal Affairs to the Council of Indigenous Peoples.
 29 March – The opening of Chien Mu House in Shilin District, Taipei.

May
 22 May – The release of Tomorrow's original soundtrack.
 25 May – China Airlines Flight 611 crashed into the Taiwan Strait, killing everybody on board.

June
 28 June – Typhoon Rammasun formed in the pacific island, affecting countries such as Taiwan, Japan, and the Philippines.

August
 1 August – The upgrade of Fooyin Institute of Technology in Kaohsiung to Fooyin University.
 17 August – The opening of National Museum of Prehistory in Taitung City, Taitung County.

September
 1 September – The upgrade of Ming Hsin Institute of Technology in Xinfeng Township, Hsinchu County to Minghsin University of Science and Technology.

October
 4 October – The opening of Daqiao Station in Yongkang City, Tainan County.

November
 10 November – The opening of Taipei Film House in Zhongzheng District, Taipei.

December
 7 December – 2002 Republic of China municipal election.
 28 December – The opening of Hsinchu Museum of Military Dependents Village in North District, Hsinchu City.
 31 December – The establishment of Mega International Commercial Bank after the merging of International Commercial Bank of China and Chiao T’ung Bank.

Deaths
 2 May – Sihung Lung, 72, Chinese-born Taiwanese actor.
 6 September – David Yen, Taiwanese activist.
 13 October – Hsieh Chun-hui, 63, Taiwanese politician, MLY (2002).

References

External links

 
Years of the 21st century in Taiwan
Taiwan
2000s in Taiwan
Taiwan